Count Dooku of Serenno, also known by his Sith name Darth Tyranus, or simply as Count Dooku, is a fictional character in the Star Wars franchise, created by George Lucas. He is an antagonist in the Star Wars prequel trilogy, appearing in both Episode II – Attack of the Clones (2002) and Episode III – Revenge of the Sith (2005), played by Christopher Lee, as well as associated media, such as books, comics, video games, and television series. Actor Corey Burton has voiced Dooku in most of his animated and video game appearances, most notably Star Wars: Clone Wars (2003–2005), Star Wars: The Clone Wars (2008–2014; 2020), and the miniseries Tales of the Jedi (2022). Lee reprised the role in the 2008 animated film that launched The Clone Wars series.

In the fictional Star Wars universe, Dooku is a prominent political figure as the Count of his home planet of Serenno, as well as a former Jedi Master, who was trained by Yoda and mentored Obi-Wan Kenobi's master Qui-Gon Jinn. After becoming disillusioned with the corruption within the Galactic Republic's Senate and losing his faith in the Jedi Order, he eventually falls to the dark side of the Force and becomes Darth Sidious' second Sith apprentice, after Darth Maul. Dooku plays a pivotal role in Sidious' rise to power, leading the Confederacy of Independent Systems, made up of numerous planetary systems seeking independence from the Republic, throughout the Clone Wars, and engineering the creation of the Republic's clone army. Although Dooku hopes this will allow him to rule the galaxy alongside Sidious, whom he secretly plots to overthrow, he is ultimately betrayed by his master, who arranges his death at the hands of his eventual replacement, Anakin Skywalker, who later falls to the dark side and becomes Darth Vader. 

Dooku's character and Christopher Lee's portrayal in the prequel films were met with generally positive reactions from fans and critics. Since the release of the films, Dooku has been highlighted as one of the best Star Wars villains, and a foil for Anakin Skywalker, whose transformation into Darth Vader is foreshadowed through Dooku's own fall to the dark side. The character has also become very popular among the Star Wars fanbase, gaining a cult following.

Portrayal 
Count Dooku was portrayed by Sir Christopher Lee in Star Wars: Episode II – Attack of the Clones and Episode III – Revenge of the Sith, while Kyle Rowling served as his stunt double. Lee also voiced the character in the Star Wars: The Clone Wars animated film, but was replaced by Corey Burton in the subsequent TV series. Burton had previously voiced Dooku in the 2003  Star Wars: Clone Wars, and went on to voice him in most of his subsequent animated and video game appearances.

Appearances

Films

Attack of the Clones (2002)
Count Dooku is introduced as the main antagonist of Attack of the Clones, as a former Jedi Master who abandoned the Jedi Order after losing faith in the Republic the Jedi served. He is also the leader of the Confederacy of Independent Systems, a confederation of planetary systems rebelling against the Galactic Republic. Dooku believes that the Republic is corrupt, and that its politicians are more interested in maintaining the bureaucracy and enriching themselves than in properly representing their people.

Dooku recruits bounty hunter Jango Fett (Temuera Morrison) to assassinate Padmé Amidala (Natalie Portman) on Coruscant, but the attempt on her life is foiled by her assigned Jedi protectors. A fight with Obi-Wan Kenobi (Ewan McGregor) forces Fett to flee from Kamino to Geonosis, and the bounty hunter rendezvous with his benefactor. After capturing Obi-Wan on Geonosis, Dooku tells him that he is attempting to save the Republic, explaining that thousands of senators are under the influence of a Sith Lord named Darth Sidious. In an attempt to convince Obi-Wan to join him, Dooku reminds him of his late master, Qui-Gon Jinn, who was Dooku's apprentice, and claims that he also would not have served the Republic had he known that a Sith was in control. Padmé and Obi-Wan's Padawan Anakin Skywalker (Hayden Christensen) later travel to Geonosis to rescue Obi-Wan, but are also captured; all three are promptly sentenced to death.

A Jedi strike team eventually arrives on the planet to rescue the trio, and are soon joined by the Republic's new clone army, resulting in a large-scale battle between the Republic and Separatist forces. Dooku tries to flee, but Obi-Wan and Anakin follow him and engage him in a lightsaber duel. Dooku subdues Anakin with Force lightning and duels and wounds Obi-Wan with his lightsaber. When Anakin comes to Obi-Wan's defense, Dooku then duels him, culminating in him cutting off the young Padawan's arm. Dooku's former Jedi Master, Yoda (Frank Oz), then arrives and the two duel. Unable to match Yoda's prowess, Dooku distracts him by using the Force to dislodge a large pillar and send it falling toward Anakin and Obi-Wan. Whilst Yoda is distracted and saves the two injured Jedi; Dooku escapes the planet in his solar sailer. Dooku then arrives on Coruscant, bringing the Geonosian designs of the Death Star to Sidious and informs his master that their plan is working: "The war has begun."

Revenge of the Sith (2005)
In the opening of Revenge of the Sith, set three years later, Count Dooku and Separatist commander General Grievous (Matthew Wood) have kidnapped Supreme Chancellor Palpatine (Ian McDiarmid)—Sidious' alter ego—as part of a plan orchestrated by Palpatine to lure Anakin to the dark side of the Force. Anakin and Obi-Wan board Grievous' ship, the Invisible Hand, and confront Dooku, who knocks Obi-Wan unconscious, leaving Anakin to face the Sith Lord alone. Anakin gives in to his hatred of Dooku and uses his anger to overpower him, severing both of Dooku's hands and leaving him helpless. Palpatine then orders Anakin to execute Dooku on the spot, thus betraying Tyranus. After initial hesitation, Anakin decapitates Dooku, much to his horror of the betrayal by his master. This dark side act sets off a chain of events that leads to Anakin's eventual fall to the dark side and transformation into Darth Vader, thus succeeding Tyranus as Sidious' apprentice and accomplishing his final goal: helping eliminate the Jedi Order and form the Galactic Empire.

In a scrapped scene from the film, Palpatine and Dooku claim that the latter arranged for the Tusken Raiders to kidnap and kill Anakin's mother (as seen in Attack of the Clones), motivating the young Jedi to kill Dooku.

The Clone Wars (2008)
In the 2008 CGI film Star Wars: The Clone Wars, Count Dooku plots to bring Jabba the Hutt into the folds of the Confederacy by enlisting Jabba's uncle Ziro the Hutt to kidnap Jabba's son Rotta. After Ziro's agents deliver the Huttlet to the planet Teth, Dooku contacts Ziro again to arrange for his minion Asajj Ventress (voiced by Nika Futterman) to take custody of Rotta. When Jabba requests Jedi assistance to rescue his son, Dooku plans to frame the Jedi for the crime. Dooku duels Anakin (voiced by Matt Lanter) for the first time since their encounter in Attack of the Clones. The duel ends in a draw, and Anakin and his Padawan Ahsoka Tano (Ashley Eckstein) eventually foil Dooku's plan.

Television

The Clone Wars (2008–2014)
In the 2008 animated series Star Wars: The Clone Wars, set between Attack of the Clones and Revenge of the Sith, Dooku is the political leader of the Separatists, and the main antagonist. In addition to sending Grievous and Ventress on missions to antagonize the Republic, he works with the terrorist group Death Watch to give the Republic a reason to send a military presence to Mandalore, which would play in his favor. The plan falls through when Duchess Satine Kryze (Anna Graves) of Mandalore urges the Galactic Senate to hold off a military force.

In the third season, Dooku is forced to eliminate his apprentice Ventress to prove his loyalty to Darth Sidious. Ventress survives, however, and works with Mother Talzin (Barbara Goodson) to kill Dooku by giving him Savage Opress (Clancy Brown) as a replacement apprentice. During a confrontation between Dooku and Ventress, Savage turns on both. In the fourth season, Dooku defeats Anakin in three separate lightsaber duels, and gets his revenge on Ventress by having General Grievous order the systematic genocide of the Nightsisters. In the fifth season, Dooku plays minor roles via hologram in guiding King Rash of Onderon and Grievous taking over Florrum.

In the sixth season, Dooku finds out the clone trooper Tup executed Order 66 prematurely and works behind the scenes to stop the Republic's investigation. He then manipulates the Banking Clan and its representative Rush Clovis (Robin Atkin Downes) into putting all their resources in the hands of the Sith, bringing war to the planet Scipio. Later, the Jedi find a lightsaber belonging to deceased Jedi Master Sifo-Dyas—whom Dooku murdered years earlier—and start an investigation. Sidious forces Dooku to clean up their trail. Dooku confronts Anakin and Obi-Wan on Oba Diah, revealing his alter-ego Darth Tyranus to the Jedi, and they realize that it was he who created the clone army. Some further investigation by Yoda prompts Dooku and Sidious to perform a Sith ritual in an unsuccessful attempt to break the Jedi Master; in a vision experienced by Yoda, Dooku fights Anakin, who swiftly defeats and executes him, in a manner very similar to his eventual demise.

Count Dooku does not directly appear in the seventh season. However, as the events of Revenge of the Sith are concurrent with the season's final arc, Ahsoka Tano is informed of his demise at Anakin's hands by Obi-Wan, who tells her that it is important to capture Maul, being the only way the Jedi can discover the true identity of Darth Sidious after Dooku's death.

Tales of the Jedi (2022)
A younger Count Dooku serves as one of the two protagonists of animated miniseries Tales of the Jedi, voiced once again by Corey Burton. He is the focus of the second, third, and fourth episodes, which depict his life as a Jedi, his increasing dissatisfaction with the corruption in the Jedi Order and the Senate, and his eventual fall to the Dark Side. The miniseries also focuses on Dooku's friendship with his padawan Qui-Gon Jinn, with original actor Liam Neeson returning to voice the character in the episode set concurrently to The Phantom Menace.

Novels

Dark Disciple (2015)
An unfinished sixth season arc of The Clone Wars was adapted into the 2015 novel Dark Disciple by Christie Golden. In the story, Dooku commands a genocidal attack on the planet Mahranee, leading the Jedi Council to send Master Quinlan Vos on a mission to assassinate Dooku. Vos partners with Dooku's former apprentice Asajj Ventress for the mission. The two confront Dooku on the planet Raxus Secundus, where Dooku was being awarded at a ceremony, but are no match for the Sith Lord, who captures Vos and forces Ventress to flee. Dooku takes Vos to Serenno, where he tortures him, eventually turning him to the dark side. Sometime later, the Jedi Council liberates Vos with the assistance of Ventress. However, upon deducing that he has turned to the dark side, the Council sends him to face Dooku again as a test of loyalty, with Obi-Wan Kenobi and Anakin Skywalker tailing him. Vos defeats Dooku, but spares his life and instead demands Dooku to lead him to Darth Sidious. Obi-Wan and Anakin arrest them and take them to Kenobi's Venator-class Star Destroyer. Vos and Dooku escape aboard Ventress' ship, killing two Jedi and many clone troopers in the process. They are shot down and crash-land on Christophsis, where they seek refuge in a Separatist tower, which is soon under attack by Jedi and Republic forces. Dooku attempts to kill Vos with Force lightning, but Ventress sacrifices her life and saves Vos. After killing Ventress, Dooku escapes the planet.

Dooku: Jedi Lost (2017)
In the audiobook Dooku: Jedi Lost by Cavan Scott, Dooku meets his sister Jenza, brother Ramil, and father Count Gora, when he visits his homeworld of Serenno as a Jedi Initiate. Dooku begins corresponding with Jenza, keeping their communications a secret for years. The audiobook also details several adventures Dooku has with his best friend, Sifo-Dyas, and Dyas's Jedi Master, Lene Kostana. During one mission, Dooku sees visions of many different futures through the Force, which shake him to the core. Eventually, Dooku becomes a Jedi Knight, trains two Padawans to knighthood, and joins the Jedi Council, hoping to bring about real change in the Republic. However, after he saves his homeworld of Serenno from invaders, he decides to remain to help his planet rebuild, leaving the Jedi Order and becoming Count Dooku of Serenno.

Thrawn: Alliances (2018)
In Thrawn: Alliances, Dooku is mentioned by Duke Solha and Padmé Amidala while they fight at Mokivj. Solha establishes that the Count had dispatched him and his siblings to Mokivj to produce cortosis B2 super battle droids for the Clone Wars.

Master & Apprentice (2019)
The novel Master & Apprentice by Claudia Gray recounts several adventures from Qui-Gon Jinn's apprenticeship under Dooku, as well as Dooku's obsession with Jedi prophecies and seeming use of Force lightning during a mission. The novel also reveals that Dooku had one other apprentice before Qui-Gon, Rael Averross.

Star Wars Legends
Dooku appears extensively in the Star Wars Expanded Universe, including novels, comic books and the 2003 TV series Star Wars: Clone Wars. In 2014, Lucasfilm labeled such material non-canon to the franchise, and rebranded them as Star Wars Legends.

Comic books
In the Star Wars: Republic series, set during the Clone Wars, Dooku trains multiple Dark Jedi apprentices, most of whom he uses as minions. His apprentices include Ventress, Tol Skorr and renegade Jedi Quinlan Vos. Vos initially intended to infiltrate the Separatists as a spy for the Jedi Council but instead nearly falls to the dark side.

Novels
In Jude Watson's Legacy of the Jedi, Dooku appears in Parts 1, 2, and 4, and is mentioned in Part 3. In Part 1, he is first tempted by the dark side of the Force as a child when his best friend and fellow Padawan Lorian Nod steals an ancient Sith Holocron from the Jedi Archives. When Nod is caught, Nod lies and says that the theft was Dooku's idea. However, Dooku manages to convince the Jedi Council of the truth, and Nod is then expelled from the Jedi Order. It is later implied that Dooku himself steals the Holocron because he is intrigued by the Sith's open embrace of power and realizes that he is just as ruthless as they are. Nod's treachery leaves Dooku with a great bitterness and intolerance of any form of betrayal, as well as an even more pronounced coldness to strangers. In Part 2, set 13 years later, he is a Jedi Knight, and takes Qui-Gon Jinn as his Padawan apprentice. By now, he is capable of masking emotions such as anger and hate that the Jedi Code forbids, stating that they in fact make him stronger. He encounters Nod while defending a Senator from space pirates, and defeats him in combat, almost executing him. However, Qui-Gon convinces him to spare Nod's life, and he and Dooku turn Nod over to the authorities. In Part 3, set 32 years later, Qui-Gon, now a Jedi Knight, remarks that he has not seen Dooku in years, noting that their relationship was never friendly. Finally in Part 4, set in the midst of the Clone Wars, Dooku, now a Sith, kills Nod after his former friend refuses to join the Separatists.

In Sean Stewart's Yoda: Dark Rendezvous, Dooku attempts to trap Yoda by offering to negotiate an end to the Clone Wars. Dooku attempts unsuccessfully to sway Yoda to his cause, while Yoda nearly convinces Dooku to return to the Jedi Order. When Anakin and Obi-Wan appear unexpectedly, Dooku believes that Yoda was trying to set him up to be captured, and renounces his former master once and for all. In the novel, it is also revealed that Dooku always resented his parents for "giving him away" to the Jedi Order.

In James Luceno's Labyrinth of Evil, Dooku engineers Grievous' transformation into a cyborg and trains him in lightsaber combat. He then schemes with Sidious to invade Coruscant in what he believes to be a plot to kill Obi-Wan and initiate Anakin into the Sith.

Matthew Stover's novelization of Revenge of the Sith expands upon Dooku's character: it portrays him as an evil man who has no concept of loyalty or friendship, and who despises the galaxy's non-human species. It also explains that Dooku believes that Palpatine's staged kidnapping is part of a plan to kill Obi-Wan and turn Anakin to the dark side. In this scenario, once the Republic becomes the Galactic Empire, Dooku and Palpatine will rule the galaxy together, while Anakin will command a “Sith Army” formed from the remains of the Jedi. The novelization depicts Dooku's death scene from his point of view. In his final moments, he realizes that Palpatine used him as a means to engineer the war and as a placeholder for Anakin, whom he intended to be his apprentice all along.

Clone Wars (2003–2005)
During the 2003 animated micro-series Star Wars: Clone Wars, Count Dooku leads the Separatists from behind the scenes, taking the dark assassin Asajj Ventress (voiced by Grey DeLisle) as his apprentice while training General Grievous in lightsaber combat. In the final episode, he plays a part in Grievous' attack on Coruscant and kidnapping Palpatine, setting the stage for Revenge of the Sith.

Toys
A number of toys based on Count Dooku have been produced, including the Lego set Lego Star Wars: Duel on Geonosis which recreates the duel between Yoda and Dooku portrayed in Attack of the Clones, and a Hasbro Count Dooku lightsaber.

Relationships

Mentorship tree

References
Citations

Works cited
 Stover, Matthew. Revenge of the Sith. Lucas Books, Century, London.

Further reading
The New Essential Guide to Characters, 1st edition, 2002. Daniel Wallace, Michael Sutfin, 
 Reynolds, David West. Star Wars: Attack of the Clones: The Visual Dictionary, hardcover, 2002. 
 Luceno, James. Star Wars: Revenge of the Sith: The Visual Dictionary, hardcover, 2005., 
 Slavicsek, Bill & Collins, Andy. Star Wars Roleplaying Game: Revised Core Rulebook, hardcover, 2002.,

External links

 
 
 Count Dooku on IMDb

Characters created by George Lucas
Fantasy television characters
Film characters introduced in 2002
Fictional characters with electric or magnetic abilities
Extraterrestrial supervillains
Star Wars Skywalker Saga characters
Fictional characters with alter egos
Fictional commanders
Fictional counts and countesses
Fictional henchmen
Fictional martial arts trainers
Fictional mass murderers
Fictional military strategists
Fictional revolutionaries
Fictional war veterans
Fictional warlords
Male film villains
Male characters in animated series
Star Wars comics characters
Star Wars literary characters
Star Wars: The Clone Wars characters
Tales of the Jedi (TV series) characters
Star Wars video game characters
Star Wars Sith characters
Video game bosses
Fictional murdered people
Film supervillains
Fictional defectors
Villains in animated television series